Roosevelt High School is a public school located in the Standish neighborhood of Minneapolis, Minnesota, United States. A part of the Minneapolis Public Schools, it is named after 26th United States President Theodore Roosevelt. Athletic and other competition teams from the school are nicknamed the Teddies. Roosevelt has been an International Baccalaureate World School since March 2010, and offers the Diploma Programme as well as the IB Career-related Certificate.

Notable alumni
Barkhad Abdi – actor, nominated for Best Actor in a Supporting Role at the 2013 Academy Awards
Peter Agre – molecular biologist, who along with Roderick MacKinnon was awarded Nobel Prize in Chemistry in 2003
Medaria Arradondo - chief of the Minneapolis Police Department, from 2017 to the present
Linda Berglin – long-time Minnesota senator and leader on issues relevant to health and human services
Ray Christensen - voice of the University of Minnesota Golden Gophers for 45 consecutive seasons
Darnella Frazier – recipient of the 2021 Pulitzer Prize special citation award for video of the murder of George Floyd
Fortune Gordien – former world record holder in the discus
Reed Larson – former National Hockey League defenseman, member of the United States Hockey Hall of Fame.
Marcus LeVesseur – (attended) 4x state champion and 4x NCAA DIII wrestler; professional Mixed martial artist in the UFC
John Linsley – performed pioneering research in the field of cosmic rays and was nominated for the Nobel Prize in physics in 1980.
Sammy Morgan (fighter) – competed on The Ultimate Fighter 2, retired professional Mixed Martial Artist
Larry Munson – collegiate and professional sportscaster
Gail Omvedt - Indian sociologist and human rights activist
Mike Ramsey – former National Hockey League defenseman, Olympic gold medalist
James Rosenquist – one of the protagonists in the pop-art movement
Don Smith – former Basketball Association of America forward
Winston Boogie Smith  – man killed by law enforcement officers in 2021
Charles Stenvig – former mayor of Minneapolis
John Thomas – former National Basketball Association forward.
Jesse Ventura – professional wrestler, 38th governor of Minnesota, and actor. Known as James Janos while in high school.
John William Vessey Jr. – (attended) United States Army general, the tenth Chairman of the Joint Chiefs of Staff, and longest-serving active duty member in the United States Army at the time he retired.

References

External links
 

High schools in Minneapolis
Minneapolis Public Schools
Educational institutions established in 1923
Public high schools in Minnesota
International Baccalaureate schools in Minnesota
1923 establishments in Minnesota